Thiré is a surname. Notable people with the surname include: 

Carlos Arthur Thiré (1917–1963), Brazilian set designer, filmmaker, costume designer, painter, and comics artist
Cecil Thiré (1943–2020), Brazilian actor and director
Jonathan Thiré (born 1986), French road bicycle racer
Miguel Thiré (born 1982), Brazilian actor